"She Still Comes Around (To Love What's Left of Me)" is a song written by Glenn Sutton and performed by Jerry Lee Lewis. It was released in September 1968 as the lead single from the album, She Still Comes Around. The song peaked at number 2 on both the U.S. Billboard Hot Country Singles chart and the Canadian RPM Country Tracks chart.

Chart performance

References

1968 singles
Jerry Lee Lewis songs
Song recordings produced by Jerry Kennedy
Songs written by Glenn Sutton
1968 songs
Smash Records singles